Avanos Medical, Inc. is a medical technology company making clinical medical devices. The company consists of two franchises – Pain Management and Chronic Care – that address reducing the use of opioids while helping patients recover faster and preventing infection.

History
Avanos Medical also manufactures and distributes Eternal Access System to help healthcare provides to fit feeding tubes into a patient safely - that is the Cortak 2.

They describe Cortrak 2 system as "a time-saving solution that benefits nurses of all levels, dieticians, and GI and ICU doctors."

In April 2022, it was reported that a voluntary field correction had been issued by the company for a vital hospital tool that could have led to injury or even death.

Avanos sells its brands and products in more than 90 countries and operates 8 principal medical device production facilities – generating approximately $612 million in net revenue.

References

External links

Manufacturing companies based in Georgia (U.S. state)
Medical technology companies of the United States
Companies listed on the New York Stock Exchange